Macotasa dimorpha is a moth of the family Erebidae. It was described by George Hampson in 1918. It is found in the Philippines.

References

Lithosiina
Moths described in 1918